The Berkeley County School District is a school district within Berkeley County, South Carolina, United States. It is based in Moncks Corner and serves all of Berkeley County including the portion of the City of Charleston on Daniel Island and the Cainhoy Peninsula.

Its attendance area is the entire county.

History

Berkeley County School District was founded in 1912 in Moncks Corner, S.C.

In 2011 Rodney Thompson became the superintendent. By 2015 he received a criminal indictment on a school bond campaign-related ethics offense, and he was removed from his position. The district made two attempts at finding a new superintendent, with the second occurring after a finalist dropped out of the process. The district selected Brenda Blackburn, previously the Montgomery County Public Schools (Virginia) superintendent, and she took the position on November 1, 2015.

By 2017 the Federal Bureau of Investigation (FBI) investigated potential embezzlement. The district fired chief financial officer Brantley Thomas on February 7, 2017. In March of that year superintendent Brenda Blackburn resigned, and Deon Jackson became the interim superintendent.

In August 2017, Dr. Eddie Ingram was hired as the superintendent of Berkeley County School District. Ingram came to BCSD after having previously served as the superintendent for Darlington County School District in Darlington, SC for several years. Prior to his time in Darlington, Ingram spent four years as the superintendent of Franklin County Schools in North Carolina. He also spent time working in North Carolina's state education department. Dr. Ingram is credited with assisting BCSD in several positive movements, including but not limited to a focus on innovation in the classroom and personalized learning. Ingram encouraged "unhitching teachers from the post" and discouraged "teaching to the test."

Dr. Ingram retired from Berkeley County School District in summer of 2021, and Mr. Deon Jackson was selected as the district 's superintendent.

On November 15, 2022, Mr. Deon Jackson was terminated from his position as Superintendent by a board vote of 6-3. On the same day the Berkeley County Board of Education voted to terminate the in-house lawyer, Tiffany Richardson, by a vote of 6-3. Mr. Deon Jackson was replaced by Interim-Superintendent, Dr. Anthony Dixon, by a board vote of 6-1. Dr. Anthony Dixon was employed by the Berkeley County School District as Chief of Academics and Innovation as well as Chief of Secondary Schools (2020-2022). He was then hired by the Charleston County School District as the interim Chief of Schools in August of 2022.

The Termination of Mr. Deon Jackson 
In the summer of 2021, Dr. Eddie Ingram retired from his position as the Superintendent of Berkeley County School District. The following finalists were named in the selection process of a new Superintendent: Deon Jackson, Anthony Dixon, & Glenda Gibson. Deon Jackson was selected by the Berkeley County Board of Education (6-2).

On November 8th, 2022, Michael Ramsey (incumbent), Mac McQuillin (incumbent), Joe Baker, Kathy Littleton (incumbent), Jimmy Hinson, Sally Wofford (incumbent), Yvonne Bradley, & Crystal Wigfall (incumbent) all won the mid-term elections. David Barrow is an at-large member of the board.

On November 16th, 2022, all board members were sworn in. 4 minutes and 8 seconds after being sworn in the board removed Mr. Barrow from his position as chair and placed Mr. McQuillin in the position by a vote of (6-2) (Mr. Barrow abstained). The board then went into executive session. After coming out of executive session, the Berkeley Elementary School drummers performed in front of the board. The board then took public comment where many people thanked Superintendent Jackson. 

After public comment, Mrs. Bradley spoke to the audience of the meeting saying, "...what we are about to do in this session, ladies & gentlemen you are being fooled by these six (pointing to Wofford, McQuillin, Ramsey, Littleton, & Hinson) I'm sorry, I'm so sorry..." The board proceeded to vote on student attendance & expulsion appeals. 

After voting on attendance & expulsion appeals, Chairmen McQuillin then recognized Miss. Littleton. Miss. Littleton stated the following, "Mr. Chairmen I make a motion to terminate the employment of Dr. Tiffany Richardson as in-house general counsel for Berkeley County School District and retain services..." The audience was shocked and expressed this aloud, Chairmen McQuillin responded by saying, "We're going to maintain order in this meeting." Miss. Littleton continued, "and retain the services of Mr. Brandon Gaskins effective immediately as discussed in executive session." the audience continued to show their views on the motion, Chairmen McQuillin responded by saying, "Alright listen up we're going to be respectful during this meeting, you may disagree with our votes, but I'd ask that you please be professional and calm, what kind of example are you setting for our kids disrupting a meeting like this?" The audience expressed their disapproval of the statement. Chairmen McQuillin proceeded to say, "... Miss. Littleton could you please repeat your motion?" (Miss Littleton repeated the motion) 

Mr. Gaskins was previously hired by the district. He was replaced by Dr. Tiffany Richardson

The motion was seconded by Mrs. Wofford, Chairmen McQuillin asked if there was any discussion to which both Mr. Barrow & Mrs. Bradley replied in the affirmative. Mr. Barrow began his discussion saying, "On what grounds were the..." Chairmen McQuillin interrupted to recognize Mr. Barrow for discussion saying, "Mr. Bradley you're recognized" Realizing his mistake Chairmen McQuillin smiled and appeared to say I'm sorry. His smile quickly faded when he heard the frustration in Mr. Barrow's voice when saying, "I'm asking the question of the person who made the motion. The person who made the motion made the motion for a reason; I'd like to know what it is." Mrs. Wigfall also voiced her question on the cause of the motion. Chairmen McQuillin then stated, "I'm recognizing Mrs. Bradley, you can ask that question if you'd like." Mrs. Bradley then asked, "What is the cause Dr. Richardson is being removed/terminated?" to which Chairmen McQullin responded by saying, "I'm not going to discuss personnel matters in executive session." Mrs. Bradley then expressed her concern with terminating an employee without a given reason, indicating the district would not be able to close the 140-teacher gap if this practice continued.

Mr. Barrow stated that he'd like to know the fee of Mr. Gaskins (the former in-house lawyer, the new one if the motion was passed) Mr. Barrow stated, "The last time I had occasion to uh discuss the fees, his fee was 375 dollars per hour" the audience expressed their shocked, Mr. Barrow went on the place a stack of invoices that total 1.6M dollars, at a cost per month of $25,946.84 from Mr. Gaskins when he was previously employed with the district. A difference of 14,000 a month from what the district pays Dr. Richardson (the in-house lawyer). Whilst Mr. Barrow was talking Mrs. Wofford said, "I move that we call the question." Mr. Barrow responded by saying, "No, I am not finished, you're not going to stop me." Chairmen McQuillin also interrupted Mr. Barrow, Mr. Barrow replied by saying, "So you're silencing me Mr. Chairmen? Are you silencing me? Are you silencing me? You know there was a time when someone was silenced and there was a lawsuit, do you recall that?"

The motion was then carried (6-3) Dr. Richardson got up and walked out the door while being applauded by members of the audience as well as Mr. Barrow, Mrs. Wigfall, & Mrs. Bradley. Mrs. Bradley then said, "Watch what's the next motion, watch the motion, listen carefully. You all have been sandbagged." McQuillin proceeded to say, "I make a motion to terminate the employment of Mr. Deon Jackson, the Superintendent of the Berkeley County School District, effective immediately." The audience, once again, expressed their disagreement with the new board. Mr. Barrow then stated, "I'd like to know the justification and the rationale reasoning for firing an individual who was just was proficient in his first annual evaluation." The audience clapped, "What's the reason Mr. Chairmen, you made the motion, now what's the reason? Why are we terminating his employment?" Mr. Barrow asked. Chairmen McQuillin responded by saying, "Mr. Barrow I'm not going to discuss Personnel matters in open session" The audience was not pleased with the Chairmen's answer. "Okay well we're going to continue the discussion then because I'm not going to let it go" Mr. Barrow said.

Mr. Barrow proceeded to explain that he was told that Dr. Jackson was being terminated due to the belief that his contract, that required a "supermajority" to terminate him unilaterally, was unconstitutional. Mr. Barrow presented legal opinions from lawyers that stated Dr. Jackson's contract was not unconstitutional. Mr. Barrow said that he believed the termination to be a "Political Witch Hunt" and the audience applauded him. The motion to terminate Mr. Deon Jackson passed (6-3).

Mr. Deon Jackson got up from his seat and walked out of the door. A group of teachers were applauded as they walked out in response to Mr. Deon Jackson being terminated. Following the teachers, majority of the audience left as well as Mrs. Wigfall & Mrs. Bradley. "Wrong, Wrong, Wrong, Wrong, Wrong" a member of the public said while pointed to 5 of the 6 who voted to terminate the employment of Dr. Jackson.

Mr. Hinson stated the following, "Mr. Chairmen, I make a motion to name Anthony Dixon as the new Superintendent of Berkeley County School District effective immediately, and order that Mr. Dixon be immediately successfully given this mid-year transition I further moved to authorize Mr. Dixon to immediately hire a new Deputy Superintendent Chief academic officer and the further restructure and reassign his cabinet with no further board action." Mr. Barrow did not stop his fight for Dr. Jackson, he questioned Dr. Dixon being able to hire a Deputy Superintendent when Dr. Jackson was denied being able to have one.

Mr. Barrow continued to fight for Dr. Jackson, repeatedly asking why Dr. Jackson was terminated to which Chairmen McQuillin responded, "...I know Anthony Dixon" Mr. Barrow then said, "I know Deon Jackson, I know Deon Jackson" Mr. Barrow wanted to hear why Dr. Jackson was terminated as the Chairmen indicated he would give an explanation when told the new lawyer wasn't present Mr. Barrow stated, "Oh, okay so there's no justification, there's no reasoning for terminating the superintendent, because you said we would hear tonight the reasoning, you said that and I'm holding you to it in public arena for you to embarrass yourself." Chairmen McQuillin ignored Mr. Barrow's requestion for an explanation and called the question on the motion which was passed (6-1). 

It is worth noting all members who voted to terminate the employment of Dr. Jackson & Dr. Richardson are backed by Moms for Liberty.

School Board

Superintendents

Schools

Magnet schools
 Berkeley Middle College
 Berkeley Center for the Arts (at GCH)
 Marrington Middle School of the Arts
 Howe Hall AIMS Elementary
 H.E. Bonner Elementary

High schools
Traditional:
 Berkeley High School
 Cane Bay High School
 Cross High School
 Goose Creek High School
 Hanahan High School
 Philip Simmons High School
 Stratford High School
 Timberland High School

Alternative:
 Berkeley Alternative School

K-8 schools
 Daniel Island School
 Carolyn Lewis School (to open in 2023)

Middle schools
 Berkeley Middle School
 Cane Bay Middle School
 College Park Middle School
 Hanahan Middle School
 Macedonia Middle School
 St. Stephen Middle School
 Sangaree Middle School
 Sedgefield Middle School
 Philip Simmons Middle School
 Westview Middle School

Elementary schools
 Berkeley Elementary
 Berkeley Intermediate
 Boulder Bluff Elementary
 Bowen's Corner Elementary
 Cainhoy Elementary
 Cane Bay Elementary
 College Park Elementary
 Cross Elementary
 Devon Forest Elementary
 Foxbank Elementary
 Goose Creek Elementary
 H.E. Bonner Elementary
 Hanahan Elementary
 J.K. Gourdin Elementary
 Marrington Elementary
 Mount Holly Elementary
 Nexton Elementary
 Philip Simmons Elementary
 St. Stephen Elementary
 Sangaree Elementary
 Sangaree Intermediate
 Westview Elementary
 Westview Primary
 Whitesville Elementary

References

External links
 
 

School districts in South Carolina
Education in Berkeley County, South Carolina
Education in Charleston, South Carolina
1912 establishments in South Carolina